Putative ribosomal RNA methyltransferase NOP2 is an enzyme that in humans is encoded by the NOP2 gene.

The protein encoded by this gene is a nucleolar antigen expressed in proliferating cells. It is not detectable in non-proliferating normal tissue but is detectable in many human tumors.

Overexpression of p120 leads to malignant transformation of 3T3 cells while treatment with antisense p120 mRNA causes the transformed cells to revert to their original non-malignant phenotype. The p120 protein displays a dramatic increase in expression at the G1/S transition suggesting that p120 regulates the cell cycle and nucleolar activity that is required for cell proliferation.

Interactions 

NOL1 has been shown to interact with MCRS1.

References

Further reading